Artistic gymnastics at the 2022 European Youth Summer Olympic Festival was held at the Stadium of Artistic Gymnastics in Banská Bystrica, Slovakia from 26 to 30 July 2022.

Medals summary

Medalists

Boys

Girls

Mixed

Medal standings

Overall

Boys

Girls

Mixed

Boys' results

Team
source:

Individual all-around
source:

Floor
source:

Pommel horse
source:

Rings
source:

Vault
source:

Parallel bars
source:

Horizontal bar
source:

Girls' results

Team
source:

Individual all-around
source:

Vault
source:

Uneven bars
source:

Balance beam
source:

Floor
source:

Mixed results

Pairs

Rounds 1&2
source:

Round 3
source: 
Bracket 1

Bracket 2

Round 4
source:

Round 5
source:

Qualification

Boys' results

Floor
source:

Pommel horse
source:

Rings
source:

Vault
source:

Parallel bars
source:

Horizontal bar
source:

Girls' results

Vault
source:

Uneven bars
source:

Balance beam
source:

Floor
source:

References

European Youth Summer Olympic Festival
2022 European Youth Summer Olympic Festival
Gymnastics in Slovakia
2022